Liverpool is a village in Fulton County, Illinois, United States. The population was 129 at the 2010 census.

History
Liverpool was first settled in 1826. Multiple mills were established in the 1830s. In 1850 a plank road was established between Liverpool and Canton, Illinois.

Geography

Liverpool is located in eastern Fulton County at  (40.390763, -90.000877), on the north bank of the Illinois River at river mile 128.

Demographics

At the 2000 census, there were 119 people, 47 households and 32 families residing in the village. The racial makeup of the village was 99.16% White, and 0.84% from two or more races. Hispanic or Latino of any race were 0.84% of the population.

There were 47 households, of which 34.0% had children under the age of 18 living with them, 55.3% were married couples living together, 6.4% had a female householder with no husband present and 31.9% were non-families. 29.8% of all households were made up of individuals, and 6.4% had someone living alone who was 65 years of age or older. The average household size was 2.53 and the average family size was 3.16.

The age distribution of the population was 28.6% under the age of 18, 6.7% from 18 to 24, 26.1% from 25 to 44, 24.4% from 45 to 64, and 14.3% who were 65 years of age or older. The median age was 38. For every 100 females, there were 108.8 males. For every 100 females age 18 and over, there were 117.9 males.

The median household income was $33,333 and the median family income was $36,250. Males had a median income of $24,375 versus $18,750 for females. The per capita income for the village was $11,848.

In the 2020 United States presidential election, residents of Liverpool voted overwhelmingly for Republican incumbent Donald Trump with 221 votes, while Democratic challenger Joe Biden received 90 votes. The town shifted 12 points towards the Republican Party compared with the 2016 election.

Transportation 
Liverpool is located right off of U.S. Route 24 and Illinois Route 78. The closest airport for commercial service is General Wayne A. Downing Peoria International Airport, though the town's closest international access is from Chicago's Midway and O'Hare airports.

References

Villages in Fulton County, Illinois
Villages in Illinois
1826 establishments in Illinois